Lu Chih-houng (1897–1973), courtesy name Youhai, was a Chinese/Taiwanese educator, metallographist, materials scientist and engineer.

Biography
Lu was born into a prominent family in Jiaxing, Zhejiang, Qing dynasty. His family was descendants of Tang dynasty Chancellor Lu Zhi. His father was former President of Zhejiang Provincial Library (浙江省立圖書館).

Lu graduated No.1 from the Tokyo Imperial University (current the University of Tokyo) Engineering School. Lu went back to China after graduation in 1924, and joined the faculty of Nanjing Engineering College (root of current Southeast University). In 1927, Lu became a professor of civil engineering of the original National Central University (now called Nanjing University). Lu was the dean of engineering faculty of the National Central University.

In 1945, Lu was sent to take-over the Taihoku Imperial University (now National Taiwan University) after the surrender of Japan at the end of World War II. In July 1946, Lu became the second President of the National Taiwan University (NTU), after Lo Tsung-lo.

Lu led the manufacture of first 99.9999999%-pure semiconductor germanium in Taiwan, helping build solid foundation for later successful semiconductor industries of Taiwan. Lu died in Taipei on May 4, 1973. A hall in the NTU is named after him, nearby there's a bronze statue built in his honour.

References
 Southeast University Archive: 陆志鸿(1897-1973)：国中央大学土木系教授(1928-1946), English Translation: Lu Chih-houng (1897-1973): National Central University Professor of Civil Engineering (1928-1946)
 Jiaxing No.1 Middle School Archive: Notable Alumni - Lu Chih-houng
 Material Research Society of Taiwan: Lu Chih-houng Memorial Award (named after his honor)

1897 births
1973 deaths
Scientists from Jiaxing
University of Tokyo alumni
Academic staff of Nanjing University
Presidents of National Taiwan University
Academic staff of Southeast University
Chinese materials scientists
Educators from Jiaxing
Engineers from Zhejiang
20th-century Taiwanese engineers
Taiwanese people from Zhejiang
Chinese expatriates in Japan
20th-century Chinese engineers